The 1968 Southern Jaguars football team was an American football team that represented Southern University as a member of the Southwestern Athletic Conference (SWAC) during the 1968 NCAA College Division football season. Led by Robert E. Smith in his fourth season as head coach, the Jaguars compiled an overall record of 4–6 with a mark of 3–4 in conference play, placing fifth in the SWAC.

Schedule

References

Southern
Southern Jaguars football seasons
Southern Jaguars football